Ryan Pulock (born October 6, 1994) is a Canadian professional ice hockey defenceman for the  New York Islanders of the National Hockey League (NHL). Pulock was drafted 15th overall by the Islanders in the 2013 NHL Entry Draft.

Playing career

Junior
Pulock was born in Dauphin, Manitoba, but grew up in Grandview, Manitoba. He was drafted by the Brandon Wheat Kings in the 2009 WHL Bantam Draft, and played with them his entire major junior hockey career. Pulock was selected by the New York Islanders in the first round (15th overall) of the 2013 NHL Entry Draft. The following season, Pulock was named to the 2014 WHL First All-Star Team.

Professional
On September 28, 2013, Pulock was signed to a three-year entry-level contract with the Islanders. Pulock played three seasons with the Islanders American Hockey League affiliate, the Bridgeport Sound Tigers before earning playing time in the NHL. While playing with the Sound Tigers he was named to the All-Rookie Team and named an AHL All-Star for two consecutive AHL seasons.

Pulock earned his first NHL call-up of the 2015–16 season after Calvin de Haan was placed on injured reserve. He made his NHL debut on February 28, 2016, against the Edmonton Oilers. He recorded his first career NHL goal on March 17, in a 4–2 loss to the Nashville Predators. Pulock also scored his first Stanley Cup playoff goal, a power play goal in Game 3 against the Florida Panthers, in the 2016 Stanley Cup playoffs.

Pulock began the 2016–17 season with the Islanders but sustained an injury at the beginning of the season, and spent the rest of the year in the AHL.

The following season fared better for Pulock, who made the team out of training camp and played the entire season in the NHL. He re-signed with the Islanders on July 17, 2018. During the 2018 offseason, Pulock volunteered as a guest instructor at Micheal Ferland's Hockey School in Brandon, Manitoba, alongside Brigette Lacquette, Harley Garrioch, Jens Meilleur, Zach Whitecloud, Tyler Plante, Shaq Merasty, Josh Elmes, and Joel Edmundson.

In the 2018-19 season, new Islanders head coach Barry Trotz paired Pulock and former South Tigers teammate Adam Pelech.

On November 4, 2020, Pulock signed a two-year, $10 million contract with the Islanders.

On October 14, 2021, Pulock signed an eight-year, $49.2 million contract extension with the Islanders.

Personal life
Pulock grew up in Grandview, Manitoba with his brothers Brock, Derrick, and parents Dave and Tannis. In 2010, while driving to see his older brother play hockey, Pulock's family got into a car accident, killing his brother Brock.

Career statistics

Regular season and playoffs

International

Awards and honours

References

External links 

1994 births
Living people
Brandon Wheat Kings players
Bridgeport Sound Tigers players
Canadian ice hockey defencemen
National Hockey League first-round draft picks
New York Islanders draft picks
New York Islanders players
Sportspeople from Dauphin, Manitoba
Ice hockey people from Manitoba